Nisbett may refer to:

People
 Grant Nisbett (born 1950), New Zealand rugby football commentator
 Louisa Cranstoun Nisbett (1812–1858), actor
 Nisbet Balfour (1743–1823), British soldier and politician
 Margaret Nisbett (born 1929), Australian soprano
 Patrice Nisbett (born 1971), Nevisian politician
 Richard E. Nisbett (born 1941), psychologist
 Steve Nisbett (1948–2018), drummer
 Thomas Nisbett (born 1925), Anglican priest 
 Trevor Nisbett (born 1957), businessman

Other
 Nisbett Building, commercial building in Big Rapids, Michigan

See also

 Nisbet (disambiguation)
 Nesbit (disambiguation)
 Nesbitt (disambiguation)